The AGO C.VII was a prototype German reconnaissance aircraft of World War I.

Design
In the C.VII, AGO attempted to improve upon its C.IV design by revising the wing bracing. The vertical fun and rudder were similar to that seen on the AGO C.V and AGO C.VI.

Operational history
After the end of World War I, the sole C.VII prototype was sold the Estonian Air Force.

Operators
 Estonian Air Force

Specifications
 Powerplant: one 200 hp Benz Bz.IV inline engine

References

 

C.VII
AGO C.07
Biplanes
Single-engined tractor aircraft
Aircraft first flown in 1916